Kelvin Mellor (born 25 January 1991) is an English footballer who plays as a defender for  club Crewe Alexandra.

Early life
Mellor was born in Crewe in Cheshire.

Career

Nantwich Town
Mellor started his career at Nantwich Town, before joining Crewe Alexandra in 2008.

Crewe Alexandra
After loan spells at Nantwich Town, Newcastle Town and Stafford Rangers, Mellor made his debut for the Alex on 27 November 2010, in the 2–1 win away at Morecambe at the Globe Arena. He came on as a second-half substitute for Byron Moore.

After several further loan spells away from Crewe at Leek Town and Icelandic team ÍBV, Mellor broke into the first team at Crewe towards the end of the 2011–12 season. He scored his first goal for the club in a 3–0 home win over Bristol Rovers. He then played the full game as Crewe won promotion in the League Two play off final at Wembley with a 2–0 win over Cheltenham Town. He was offered a new contract at the end of the season.

He signed a new two-year contract on 16 July 2012, despite interest from Championship side Derby County, who offered Mellor a three-year contract. Mellor with his father and representatives held talks with Derby after he was initially offered a one-year contract at Crewe, with an angry Derby manager Nigel Clough saying "It must be difficult for him going back to the dressing room after all the things he said to us. And then when everyone was starting back for pre-season he decided to go to Ibiza with his mates for five days."

Plymouth Argyle
After leaving Crewe Alexandra in the summer of 2014 he signed for League Two side Plymouth Argyle on a two-year deal. Mellor subsequently left Argyle in July 2016.

Blackpool
In 2016, he signed for Blackpool. He scored his first goal for Blackpool in a 4-2 EFL Cup win against Bolton Wanderers on 9 August 2016.

Bradford City
On 31 July 2018, Kelvin Mellor signed for fellow League One side Bradford City on a two-year deal On 26 May 2020 it was announced that he was one of 10 players who would leave Bradford City when their contract expired on 30 June 2020.

Morecambe
On 13 August 2020, Mellor signed for Morecambe. Following promotion with the club to League One, he signed a one-year extension in June 2021.

Carlisle United
On 31 August 2021, Mellor signed a one-year deal with League Two side Carlisle United. On 9 May 2022, Mellor was released by the club at the end of the 2021–22 season.

Return to Crewe
On 20 May 2022, Mellor returned to his first professional club Crewe Alexandra on a free transfer following their relegation to League Two. He started in Crewe's opening game of the 2022–23 season, a 2–1 victory over Rochdale at Spotland, and scored in the following game, a 3–0 home win over Harrogate Town at Gresty Road on 6 August 2022.

Career statistics

Honours
Crewe Alexandra
Football League Two play-offs: 2012
Football League Trophy: 2012–13

Blackpool
EFL League Two play-offs: 2017

Morecambe
EFL League Two play-offs: 2021

Individual
PFA Team of the Year: 2016–17 League Two

References

External links

1991 births
Living people
English footballers
Association football midfielders
Association football defenders
Nantwich Town F.C. players
Crewe Alexandra F.C. players
Plymouth Argyle F.C. players
Newcastle Town F.C. players
Stafford Rangers F.C. players
Leek Town F.C. players
Íþróttabandalag Vestmannaeyja players
Blackpool F.C. players
Bradford City A.F.C. players
Morecambe F.C. players
Carlisle United F.C. players
Northern Premier League players
National League (English football) players
English Football League players
Expatriate footballers in Iceland